Henry Clay "Harry" Sloan (August 12, 1846January 19, 1915) was an American lawyer and politician.  He served two non-consecutive terms in the Wisconsin State Assembly.  His father, and uncle, both served in the United States House of Representatives.

Early life
Henry C. Sloan was born in DeRuyter, Madison County, New York, on August 12, 1846.  As a child, he moved west with his parents in 1854, settling at Beaver Dam, Wisconsin, where he was raised and educated.  When he was old enough, he was sent to New York City to study law with his uncle.

Military service
While in New York, he ran away from his uncle's home and joined up with a New York regiment for service in the Union Army in the American Civil War.  In December 1863, he transferred to the 5th Wisconsin Infantry Regiment and served as a private in Company D.  He served with the 5th Wisconsin Infantry in the Army of the Potomac in the eastern theater of the war and participated in the battles at the Wilderness, Spotsylvania Courthouse, North Anna, Cold Harbor, and the Siege of Petersburg.  In July 1864, he was commissioned as a 2nd lieutenant in the United States Marine Corps, but when it was determined that he was just 17 years old, he was forced to resign.  He re-enlisted with the Wisconsin volunteers and was commissioned 1st lieutenant of Company I in the new 48th Wisconsin Infantry Regiment.

He served with the 48th Wisconsin Infantry through the end of the war, and then secured a commission as a 2nd lieutenant in the regular U.S. Army.  He was promoted to 1st lieutenant in July 1866 and served with the 4th U.S. Infantry Regiment through the end of 1870, working on railroad construction in the west.

Legal and political career
After leaving the Army, Sloan returned to studying law, this time at his father's office in Beaver Dam.  He was admitted to the bar on March 5, 1872, and practiced law at Beaver Dam until 1875, when he moved to Appleton, Wisconsin.  At Appleton, he was quickly elected city attorney, serving from 1876 through 1880.  In the Fall of 1880, he was elected to the Wisconsin State Assembly, serving in the 1881 session.

After the 1881 legislative session, he moved to Milwaukee and worked in a legal partnership with Winfield Smith until 1889.  During this time he changed his political affiliation from Democratic to Republican and remained a devoted Republican for the rest of his life.

He then moved to Superior, Wisconsin, and engaged in the real estate business.  At Superior, he was again elected city attorney; he served on the board of public works and was president of the board of education.  He was elected to his second term in the State Assembly in 1894, representing Douglas County.  After the 1895 legislative session, he was appointed district attorney of Douglas County to fill the unexpired term of C. J. Monson, who had died unexpectedly.  He was subsequently elected to a full term as district attorney in the 1896 general election, serving through 1898.

In 1901, he returned to Appleton, where he resumed his legal practice, working until his death in 1915.  Sloan died January 19, 1915, after an abscess burst on his lung.

Personal life and family
Henry Sloan was one of eight children born to A. Scott Sloan and his wife Mary Angeline "Ann" ( Dodge).  A. Scott Sloan was a prominent lawyer in early Wisconsin and served as a U.S. congressman, Wisconsin Attorney General, and Wisconsin circuit court judge.  Henry Sloan's uncle, Ithamar Sloan, was also a prominent lawyer and served as a U.S. congressman.

Henry Sloan married Helen Lois Phinney of Green Lake, Wisconsin, on November 19, 1879.  Helen Phinney was a descendant of John Howland, one of the signers of the Mayflower Compact.  They had no children.

Electoral history

Wisconsin Assembly (1880)

| colspan="6" style="text-align:center;background-color: #e9e9e9;"| General Election, November 2, 1880

Wisconsin Assembly (1894)

| colspan="6" style="text-align:center;background-color: #e9e9e9;"| General Election, November 6, 1894

References

1846 births
1915 deaths
People from Madison County, New York
Politicians from Appleton, Wisconsin
Politicians from Superior, Wisconsin
Members of the Wisconsin State Assembly
District attorneys in Wisconsin
Wisconsin city attorneys
School board members in Wisconsin
Wisconsin Republicans
Wisconsin Democrats
People of Wisconsin in the American Civil War
Military personnel from Wisconsin
Union Army officers
Union Army soldiers
United States Marine Corps officers
United States Army officers
19th-century American politicians
19th-century American lawyers